Mannlicher M1890 can refer to:
Mannlicher M1890 Carbine, a carbine that used a straight-pull bolt action with two solid lugs
Mannlicher M1890 Rifle, a variant of the Mannlicher M1888 rifle produced after 1890